The 18th New Zealand Parliament was a term of the New Zealand Parliament. It was elected at the 1911 general election in December of that year.

1911 general election

The Second Ballot Act 1908 was used for the 1911 general election. The first ballot was held on Thursday, 7 December in the general electorates.  The second ballots were held one week later on 14 December. The Second Ballot Act did not apply to the four Māori electorates and the election was held on Tuesday, 19 December.  A total of 80 MPs were elected; 42 represented North Island electorates, 34 represented South Island electorates, and the remaining four represented Māori electorates.  590,042 voters were enrolled and the official turnout at the election was 83.5%.

Sessions
The 18th Parliament sat for four sessions (there were two sessions in 1912), and was prorogued on 20 November 1914.

Party standings

Start of Parliament

End of Parliament

Ministries
The Liberal Government of New Zealand had taken office on 24 January 1891.  Joseph Ward formed the Ward Ministry on 6 August 1906. The Ward Ministry remained in power until Ward's resignation as Prime Minister in March 1912.  The Liberal Party remained in power only on the casting vote of the Speaker, Arthur Guinness, selected Thomas Mackenzie as Prime Minister and he formed the Mackenzie Ministry on 28 March 1912. In July 1912, Mackenzie lost a vote of no confidence, resigned as Prime Minister and handed over to William Massey of the Reform Party, bringing to an end the long reign of the Liberal Party. The Massey Ministry lasted for the remainder of the parliamentary term.

Initial composition of the 18th Parliament

By-elections during 18th Parliament
There were a number of changes during the term of the 18th Parliament.

Notes

References

18